Count Basie Presents Eddie Davis Trio + Joe Newman (also released as Countin' on Basie) is an album by saxophonist Eddie "Lockjaw" Davis' Trio with Count Basie and Joe Newman recorded in late 1957 and originally released on the Roulette label.

Reception

AllMusic awarded the album 3 stars.

Track listing
All compositions by Eddie "Lockjaw" Davis except as indicated
 "Broadway" (Billy Byrd, Teddy McRae, Henri Wood) - 4:36
 "Don't Blame Me" (Jimmy McHugh, Dorothy Fields) - 3:50 	
 "A Misty One" - 4:37
 "Save Your Love for Me" (Oscar Pettiford) - 3:56
 "Telegraph" - 5:07
 "Farouk" - 5:22
 "Lock-Up" - 2:57 
 "On the Street of Dreams" (Victor Young, Sam M. Lewis) - 2:51 	
 "Swingin' Till the Girls Come Home" (Pettiford) - 5:31

Personnel 
Eddie "Lockjaw" Davis - tenor saxophone
Count Basie - piano
Joe Newman - trumpet
Shirley Scott - organ
George Duvivier - bass
George "Butch" Ballard - drums

References 

1958 albums
Eddie "Lockjaw" Davis albums
Count Basie albums
Joe Newman (trumpeter) albums
Roulette Records albums
Albums produced by Teddy Reig